The Henley-on-Todd Regatta (also called the Todd River Race) is a "boat" race held annually in the typically dry sandy bed of the Todd River in Alice Springs, Australia.

It began – and continues – cautiously as a joke at the expense of the original British colonizers and the formal atmosphere of the British river races which continue today. Every year on the third Saturday of August, the town holds a mock regatta which large numbers of locals and tourists attend. Food and drink are sold at stalls, "no fishing" signs are put up, and the celebration takes all day. It is the only dry river regatta in the world; thus, it was the first regatta cancelled because of wet weather, on the occasion when there is actually water in the river. This happened in 1993, when the event was cancelled for the year due to flooding. However, the Alice Springs Hash House Harriers and Katherine Hash House Harriers running groups put their boat entry into the water and completed the course under protest of the track officials. This was televised by ABC and shown around Australia on the nightly news. 

"Boats" are made from metal frames and hung with banners and advertisements, and teams of "rowers" run their boats in races through the hot sand. Races are also held in washtubs, human-sized hamster wheels and at the final event, modified trucks decked out as boats are driven by teams armed with flour bombs and water cannon. Many bystanders end up as casualties of the final battle. Traditional teams include Pirates and Vikings, complete with costumes. Who wins the final battle can be difficult to determine; even the announcers occasionally get a blast.

History 
Reg Smith at the Alice Springs Meteorological Bureau proposed an actual regatta along the lines of the famous Henley Royal Regatta (at Henley-on-Thames, thus the name of the regatta) in 1962.

Watching seemingly sane people race in bottomless "eights", "Oxford tubs", "bath tubs" and yachts through the deep coarse sand of the Todd River is a unique spectacle amongst world sporting events and attracts many local and international participants.

The Henley-On-Todd Regatta is run entirely on a volunteer basis by three Rotary Clubs based in 'the Alice'. 

The Todd River was named in 1871 by surveyor W. W. Mills after Sir Charles Todd, Superintendent of Telegraphs and Postmaster General of South Australia, who was the driving force for constructing the Australian Overland Telegraph Line from Port Augusta to Darwin. The river is usually dry, but prone to flooding during the wet season. Mills also named a waterhole in the bed of the Todd River as Alice Springs for Todd's wife, Alice, and this name was subsequently used for the telegraph station, and later the town.

References

External links 
 Henley-on-Todd Regatta Official website – Photos, history, contacts, events
 Sydney Morning Herald on Alice Springs – Includes references to the Todd River and the Henley-on-Todd Regatta

Festivals in the Northern Territory
Sport in Alice Springs
1962 establishments in Australia
Annual sporting events in Australia
Recurring sporting events established in 1962
Boat festivals